Star Wars Racer may refer to various video games based on the pod racing scene from the film Star Wars: Episode I – The Phantom Menace:

Star Wars Episode I: Racer, 1999 home console
Star Wars Racer Revenge, 2002 sequel
Star Wars: Racer Arcade, 2000 arcade racing game